The Reality of My Surroundings is the third studio album by Fishbone, released on April 23, 1991. It was the first Fishbone album to include former Miles Davis music director John Bigham (guitar, keyboards), who joined in 1989 during the Truth and Soul tour.

Album information

Fishbone took the rest of 1989 off before beginning to write songs for the follow-up to Truth and Soul. The project was plagued by production delays until November 1990, when the band entered Ocean Way Recording, booking two months of studio time in which to record the album. Fishbone self-produced the album with assistance of David Kahne which includes the singles, "Fight the Youth", "Everyday Sunshine" and "Sunless Saturday".

The album's title comes from a line in track 3, "So Many Millions", which reads "I cannot get over legitimately, the Reality of My Surroundings do not point to the sky".

Packaging
The CD cover shows only John Norwood Fisher, with a larger picture of the band sitting in a living room being visible when the CD cover is unfolded.  The vinyl version shows the full band's living-room portrait, spanning both sides of the outer gatefold cover.

Release and reception

With this album, Fishbone obtained critical and commercial success with a ranking of No. 49 on the Billboard 200 on May 18, 1991. Due to the sudden implementation of Nielsen SoundScan tracking figures on the Billboard charts, The Reality of My Sourroundings sharply dropped to No. 182 in two weeks. The album ultimately spent ten weeks on the Billboard 200, and by 1997 the album had sold nearly 200,000 copies in the United States.

The album is widely considered by fans and critics as the creative peak of the band. People called The Reality of My Surroundings Fishbone's most impressive album. Trouser Press wrote that "the sprawling [album] reprises much of Truth and Soul‘s spirit and sound, but is far more ambitious in scope and philosophy."

Fishbone experienced a large growth in concert tickets and record sales during this period, making two memorable television appearances: performing "Sunless Saturday" and "Everyday Sunshine" on Saturday Night Live, and "Everyday Sunshine" on The Arsenio Hall Show. The SNL performance of "Sunless Saturday" has been re-edited in reruns. The original television broadcast showed a brief glimpse of Angelo Moore doing a backflip on stage. The re-edited version simply switches the camera angle, making it possible to see the full flip right after signaling "Special K" (Kendall Jones) to do his guitar solo.

Track listing

Personnel

Fishbone
Angelo Moore – saxophone, theremin, vocals
Walter A. Kibby II – trumpet, vocals
Kendall Jones – lead guitar, vocals
Chris Dowd – keyboards, trombone, vocals
John Bigham – guitar, keyboard
John Norwood Fisher – bass guitar, vocals
Philip "Fish" Fisher – drums

Additional
Sam Mims – programming
Fenando Pullum – trumpet
T-Bone – percussion
Greg Bell, Vicky Calhoun, Aklia Chin, Katherine Cederquist, Jeff Conners, Larry Fishburne, James Grey, Kyva Holmes, Nadja Holmes, Wendell Holmes, Natalie Jackson, Gaz Mayall, Sultana Muhammad, Susan Rogers, Clip Payne, Suesan Stovall (spelled "Susan Stoval" in the album's liner notes), Kristen Vigard, Byron West – background vocals

Engineers
Lawrence Duhart
Clark Germain
Joel Stoner

Accolades

Charts
Album – Billboard (United States)

Singles – Billboard (United States)

References

1991 albums
Columbia Records albums
Fishbone albums
Albums produced by David Kahne